Cofete is a small village in the western part of the Jandía peninsula in Fuerteventura, Canary Islands. It is part of the municipality Pájara. It is situated in a nature reserve (Parque Natural de Jandía). The Villa Winter is situated on a mountain slope near Cofete.

References

External links

Cofete / Villa Winter Information, Map, Video and Photos
http://www.bernds-welt.de/reise_fuerte07.html (in German)
Cofete: How to get there, Photos - All You Need To Know

Beaches of the Canary Islands
Populated places in Fuerteventura